Garcinia parvifolia, the Kundong, Brunei cherry or Asam aur aur, is a tropical evergreen tree native to Borneo, Peninsular Malaysia, Sulawesi and Sumatra. The bark, wood, leaves, and fruit of the kundong tree are used by humans.

Propagation 
Kundong trees grow in the humid interior of Borneo. The trees can be found at higher elevations along ridges and near riverbanks. The kundong propagates through seeds that take around six months to germinate. The tree grows quickly and once planted can produce fruit in as little as 4 years. The majority of kundong grow in the wild, but the tree can be cultivated in gardens.

Usage 
In Borneo the bark of the tree is used to produce resin, while the wood is used in furniture or for carving. The juvenile leaves of the tree are eaten as a vegetable. The plant is used as a rootstock for mangosteen.

Fruit 
Kundong can be eaten raw or cooked. The small red-yellow fruit has a sour taste with a sweet white pulp. Younger fruits are used to produce a sour taste in other types of food, such as curry. The fruit is about the size of a cherry and looks similar to a purple mangosteen, hence the nicknames Brunei cherry (interchangeable with Borneo cherry) and red mangosteen.

References 

parvifolia
Flora of Borneo
Flora of Malaya
Flora of Sulawesi
Flora of Sumatra
Fruits originating in Asia